"Goodbye Heartbreak" is a song written by British musical duo Lighthouse Family with former Simply Red member Tim Kellett for their debut studio album, Ocean Drive (1996). The song was produced by Mike Peden. It was released as the third single from the album on 9 September 1996 and reached the top 20 in the United Kingdom.

Chart performance
After the release of "Goodbye Heartbreak", the single reached number 14 on the UK Singles Chart, giving Lighthouse Family their third successive top-20 hit. The song stayed on the UK Singles Chart for six weeks. "Goodbye Heartbreak" also reached number 86 in Germany and appeared on the Eurochart Hot 100, peaking at number 64 in October 1996.

Critical reception
Ralph Tee from Music Weeks RM Dance Update stated that the duo "return with a third single which possesses all the characteristics of the duo's funky-based guitar band style", adding that "this sounds like another hit to me."

Track listings
 UK CD1 "Goodbye Heartbreak" (Phil Bodger Mix)
 "Goodbye Heartbreak" (Linslee Main Mix) 
 "Ocean Drive" (Mindspell's Miami Beach Experience—radio mix)

 UK CD2 "Goodbye Heartbreak" (Phil Bodger Mix)
 "Goodbye Heartbreak" (acoustic)
 "Ocean Drive" (acoustic)

 UK cassette single'
 "Goodbye Heartbreak" (Phil Bodger Mix)
 "Goodbye Heartbreak" (Linslee Main Mix)

Charts

References

External links
 Official Charts Company - UK chart performance of Lighthouse Family's "Goodbye Heartbreak"
 Eurochart Hot 100 which shows the peak position of Lighthouse Family's "Goodbye Heartbreak"

1995 songs
1996 singles
Lighthouse Family songs
Polydor Records singles
Songs written by Paul Tucker (musician)
Songs written by Tim Kellett
Songs written by Tunde Baiyewu